The Paderewski Prize for American Composers (aka Paderewski Fund for the Encouragement of American Composers) was a prize awarded to American composers every three years from 1901 to 1948. The prizes were sums of money ($1000 for a symphonic work, $500 or chorus and chamber) offered by the Trustees of the Paderewski Fund for American composers of (i) the best symphonic music and (ii) the best chamber music.  For reference, $1000 in 1920 would be worth about $12,331 in 2014, assuming an annual inflation rate of 2.71%.  The prestige of the prize far outweighed the cash benefit.  In most cases, the publicity from the prizes led to assurances of international performances.

Paderewski established a similar fund for Composers in Leipzig in 1898.

History 
On May 15, 1900, Paderewski established the Ignacy Jan Paderewski Trust of $10,000.  In November 1900, Paderewski defined a series of prizes, under the Paderewski Trust, for the encouragement of American composers.  Initially the prize categories, limited to American composers, were (i) piece for full orchestra, (ii) piece for chorus with orchestra accompaniment, with or without solo voice parts (iii) a piece for chamber music for any combination of instruments.  The works were submitted anonymously — under an assumed name or motto, accompanied with a seal envelope containing the composers name; and the works must never have been performed in public or offered at any previous competition.

The prize was actually intended to launch in 1897. In a letter dated April 21, 1896, Paderewski expressed to William Steinway his gratitude to Americans, with $10,000, his wish to establish a fund with Henry Lee Higginson of Boston and William Mason of New York serving as co-trustees.  The initial prize sums were to be $500 for a full symphony work, $500 for a choral work with orchestra, and $200 for a chamber work.  William Steinway, who died in 1896, had added $1,500 around the time of his death, in order to make the prize immediately operative.

Trustees 
Two of the fund's founding trustees were Henry Lee Higginson and William Payne Blake (1846–1922), a banker.  Higginson died in 1919 and Blake died on March 7, 1922.  In June 1922, Paderewski appointed successor trustees Arthur D. Hill (1869–1947) and Joseph Adamowski (1862–1930).  Adamowski was a Polish-born American cellist with the Boston Symphony and relative of Paderewski.  He was also the father of Tadeusz Adamowski, 1928 Olympic Polish hockey player and Helenka Pantaleoni, silent film actress and founding director of UNICEF.

Other trustees
 Harrison Keller
 Wallace Goodrich (1871–1952), New England Conservatory faculty from 1897 to 1947
 Adams Sherman Hill (1896–1968) (son of Arthur D. Hill)

Selected prize recipients

Selected commission recipients 
Beginning in the 1950s, the Paderewski Fund for the Encouragement of American Composers was renamed Paderewski Fund for Composers and began awarding commissions to composers, in lieu of the competition.

References 

Music competitions in the United States
1901 establishments in the United States
1948 disestablishments in the United States